Nguyễn Bá Lương (21 January 1902 – 1989) was a South Vietnamese engineer and politician who served as a member of the House of Representatives of the Republic of Vietnam from 1967 until the collapse of South Vietnam on 30 April 1975. He also served as the 1st Speaker of the House of Representatives of the Republic of Vietnam from 1967 to 1971.

Political career
After President Thiệu's speech to the joint session of the National Assembly of the Republic of Vietnam on 2 November 1968, Speaker Lương and along with other lawmakers marched to the Independence Palace demanding Thiệus' and Vice President Kỳ's responses on what the future of South Vietnam would be like if the US were to abandon them. 

In 1969 during a trip to the Republic of Korea Speaker Lương was bestowed the Order of Diplomatic Service Merit of the Republic of Korea by South Korean President Park Chung-hee.

On 14 January 1971, Speaker Lương led a delegation of ten members of the National Assembly to Taipei for a five-day visit. Once arriving at the airport Speaker Lương express to reporters that the relationship between the Republic of China and the Republic of Vietnam is close, and the two nations have many similarities in culture and customs. He hopes that this visit to China will further promote the friendship and cooperation between the two countries.

References

1902 births
South Vietnamese politicians
Members of the National Assembly (South Vietnam)
1989 deaths